The Worldwide Institute of Sustainable Development Planners (WISDP) was formed in October 2017 by a group of academics and professionals to further the UN Agenda 2030 and the United Nations' 17 Sustainable Development Goals It is supported by the UNESCO Hong Kong Association (UNESCO HK) and the Hong Kong Institute of Education for Sustainable Development. 

WISDP is a learning and research institute which cooperates with the United Nations' sustainable development policy to promote sustainable development planning for individuals and organizations. It provides training, membership, and certification to businesses, industries, educational institutions, NGOs and government entities, as well as running courses for secondary schools students and teachers. 

WISDP is also supported by UNESCO Office of Pacific States, UNESCO Chair in the Political Economy of Education, the UNESCO Chair in TVET and Lifelong Learning, Members of Working Groups of UNPRME (UN Principles for Responsibility of Management Education), Members of UN Global Compact, and Members of UNOSCO (UN Organization of South- Coperation).

History 
UNESCO Hong Kong Association (UNESCO HK) is dedicated to facilitating and achieving UNESCO's mission, creating conditions for dialogue among nations, cultures and peoples based upon respect for commonly shared values. It is through this dialogue that the world can achieve global visions of sustainable development encompassing observance of human rights, mutual respect and the alleviation of poverty. It strives to work towards the building of peace and to facilitate the sustainable development of society, economy and environment through education, sciences and culture.

The United Nation 2030 Agenda for Sustainable Development was formed by 2015 and established 17 Sustainable Development Goals (17 SDGs) and 169 work targets  to push the sustainable development for year 2030 worldwide. To push and support the sustainable development of United Nations, a partner of UNESCO HK, WISDP was established in October 2017 to cooperate with UNESCO HK to push and facilitate the development, planning and implementation of 17 SDGs. WISDP is a worldwide study and research institute to drive the training and professional recognition of sustainable development to industries, business, education and public service.

WISDP was registered in Hong Kong with the company name WORLD INSTITUTE OF SUSTAINABLE DEVELOPMENT PLANNERS LIMITED and was incorporated on 12 October 2017 as a company limited by guarantee. WISDP was formally launched in February 2018 and partner with training institutes to provide different levels of sustainable development training to industries and business. WISDP also establishes memberships and certification processes to recognize the training, experiences and contributions of sustainable development for individuals and organizations.

Learned Society of Sustainable Development
The United Nations established the training and initiatives of sustainable development to keep the sustainability of the earth as well as the human development. Sustainable development implies economic growth together with the protection of environmental quality and social situation, each reinforcing the other. It is crucial to harmonize three core elements: economic growth, social inclusion and environmental protection. The Earth is the home of human beings and we need to protect  the sustainability of the Earth through sustainable development, culture, and planning.

WISDP is a Learned Society fostering and advocating UN Agenda 2030 for Sustainable Development and the 17 Sustainable Development Goals in accordance with the three components  of Environment, Society and Economy. Training is provided for professionals according to their needs and successful trainees are awarded professional membership from WISDP and UNESCO HK Association, and subject to adequate relevant work experience, they are entitled to become Certified Sustainable Development Planners (CSDP). Opportunities are provided for awardees to apply for Fellowship status after a number of years of continuing professional development (CPD).

In 2018, WISDP Divisions launched training programmes and lead to professional memberships. The training programmes included Corporate Social Responsibility (CSR), Sustainable Finance and Investment, Health Society and Wellness, Early Childhood Education, Sustainability in Engineering, and sustainable development in Insurance.

Promotion and recognition of sustainable development
WISDP partners with universities, training institutes and other professional bodies to promote and develop sustainable development planning in the business, industrial and education sectors. The study levels includes diploma, certificate and continuing professional development training.

WISDP also promotes sustainable development to business organizations. WISDP supports corporations to promote and implement sustainable leadership, processes, products, services as well as business strategies. Corporations may join the WISDP to cooperate with their sustainable development programs and WISDP will award the corporations that have contributed sustainable development to the industries and society.

WISDP is set up as a professional organization and membership for practicing sustainable development planning. Principally individuals who support and experienced sustainable development planners may join. WISDP offers various categories of membership to recognize different levels of sustainable development. WISDP is welcome to people who are not practicing but are interested in the profession or students who aspire to join the profession in the future.

References

External links 
 Worldwide Institute of Sustainable Development Planner (WISDP) Website

UNESCO
2017 establishments in Hong Kong
Sustainable development